Strange Attractor is the seventh studio album by German band Alphaville, released in 2017. It placed on No. 39 in the German albums chart in April 2017.

Track listing 
All lyrics by Marian Gold, music by Alphaville.

Personnel
Marian Gold - vocals
David Goodes - guitars
Jakob Kiersch - drums
Carsten Brocker - keyboards
Alexandra Merl - bass

References

2017 albums
Alphaville (band) albums